The Finlayson Islands are a string of Canadian arctic islands in Nunavut, Canada.

An early survey was made by Sir Richard Collinson on board the Enterprise during his search for Sir John Franklin's lost expedition. Collinson noted the islands to be a basalt ridge running south/southeast.

Colonies of Thayer's gull and glaucous gull are located on one of the larger islands.

References 

Victoria Island (Canada)
Uninhabited islands of Kitikmeot Region